Eduardo Nava (born 11 March 1997) is an American tennis player.

Nava has a career high ATP singles ranking of 792 achieved on 15 August 2022. He also has a career high ATP doubles ranking of 911 achieved on 15 August 2022.

Nava made his ATP main draw debut at the 2021 Winston-Salem Open after entering the singles main draw as a lucky loser. He lost to Thiago Monteiro 5–7, 1–6.

Nava played college tennis at TCU and Wake Forest University.

Nava comes from a family of athletes. He is the son of sprinter Eduardo Nava and tennis player Xóchitl Escobedo. His brother, Emilio Nava, and cousin, Ernesto Escobedo are both professional tennis players.

References

External links
 
 
 

1997 births
Living people
American male tennis players
People from Northridge, Los Angeles
TCU Horned Frogs men's tennis players
Wake Forest Demon Deacons men's tennis players
Tennis players from Los Angeles